A vagus ganglion (plural: vagus ganglia) is a small, elongated ganglion located between the esophagus and aorta. They mark the terminus of the recurrent nerve.

See also
nervous system
neuron
ganglion

References

Nervous ganglia of the torso
Vagus nerve